Meriç Banu Yenal (born April 24, 1988 in İstanbul, Turkey) is a Turkish female basketball player. The young national plays last 3 years for Migrosspor under loan contract from Fenerbahçe İstanbul. She plays power forward and is 185 cm tall.

She played for Migros, Kocaeli Büyükşehir Belediyesi Kağıtspor, Ceyhan Belediyesi, Antakya Belediyesi, Canik Belediyesi and Samsun Basketbol Kulübü. In 2013-2014 She will play for Edirnespor.

See also
 Turkish women in sports

References

1988 births
Living people
Turkish women's basketball players
Fenerbahçe women's basketball players
Basketball players from Istanbul